Biswajit Daimary (born 4 February 1971) is an Indian politician from Bharatiya Janata Party who is serving as the Speaker of Assam Legislative Assembly since 2021.
He represents the Panery constituency in Assam Legislative Assembly since 2021.He was also member of Rajya Sabha as a member of the Bharatiya Janata Party from 2021 to 2021 and as a member of the Bodoland People's Front from 2008 to 2020. In November 2020, Daimary left BPF to join Bharatiya Janata Party before Bodoland Territorial Council elections.

Personal life
Daimary was born to Surendra Daimary and Fedab Daimary in Suagpur, Baksa district in Assam. He completed Higher Secondary education from Kokrajhar College. He married Mina Brahma Daimary on 4 December 1999.

Positions held
Political positions held by Daimary:
 2001–2006 – Member of Assam Legislative Assembly
 2006–2008 – Chairman, Assam Apex Weavers and Artisans Co-operative Federation Limited, Government of Assam
 Apr. 2008 to Nov. 2021 – Elected to Rajya Sabha
 Sep. 2010 – Member, Committee on Subordinate Legislation
 May 2008 to May 2009 – Member, Committee on Transport, Tourism, and Culture
 May 2008 to May 2009 – Member, Consultative Committee for the Ministry of Railways
 Aug. 2009 to present – Member, Consultative Committee for the Ministry of Railways
 Aug. 2009 to present – Member, Committee on Chemicals and Fertilizers.
 2021–present – Member of Assam Legislative Assembly
 2021–present – Speaker of Assam Legislative Assembly

References

1971 births
Living people
Rajya Sabha members from Assam
People from Baksa district
Speakers of the Assam Legislative Assembly
Bodoland People's Front politicians
Bharatiya Janata Party politicians from Assam
Assam MLAs 2021–2026
Assam MLAs 2001–2006